The 2017 Royal Bank Cup was the 47th Canadian junior A Ice Hockey National Championship for the Canadian Junior Hockey League and the 47th consecutive year a national championship was awarded to this skill level since the breakaway of Major Junior hockey in 1970.  The tournament was played at the Cobourg Community Centre in Cobourg, Ontario.

Teams
Cobourg Cougars (Host)
Regular Season: 39-11-0-4 (3rd OJHL North East Conference)
Playoffs: Defeated Kingston (4-0), Defeated Wellington (4-1), Defeated by Trenton (0-4).
Brooks Bandits (Western #1)
Regular Season: 51-5-4 (1st AJHL Viterra South)
Playoffs: Defeated Olds (4-0), Defeated Okotoks (4-1), Defeated Whitecourt (4-0) to win league.
Western Canada Cup Champions: Round Robin Games - Defeated Chilliwack Chiefs (5-2), Shootout win Penticton Vees (4-3), Defeated Battlefords North Stars (4-1), Defeated Portage Terriers (5-0). Championship Game Defeated Chilliwack Chiefs (6-1).
Penticton Vees (Western #2)
Regular Season 41-13-4 (1st BCHL Interior Division)
Playoffs: Defeated Merritt Centennials (4-3) Defeated Vernon Vipers (4-3), Defeated Chilliwack Chiefs (4-3)
Western Canada Cup: Defeated Battlefords North Stars (2-1), Shootout loss Brooks Bandits (3-4), Defeated by Chilliwack Chiefs (4-2), Defeated Portage Terriers (5-3). Semi-final Game: Defeated Battlefords North Stars (4-0). Runner-Up Game Defeated Chilliwack Chiefs (3-2).
Trenton Golden Hawks (Central)
Regular Season: 42-9-2-1 (1st OJHL North East Conference)
Playoffs: Defeated Newmarket Hurricanes (4-0), Defeated Stouffville Spirit (4-0), Defeated Cobourg Cougars (4-0), Defeated by Georgetown Raiders (3-4).
Dudley Hewitt Cup hosts.
Dudley Hewitt Cup: Round Robin Games - Defeated Powassan Voodoos (5-1), Shootout loss Georgetown Raiders (0-1)
Defeated Dryden Ice Dogs (10-4). Championship Game! Defeated Georgetown Raiders (2-1)
Terrebonne Cobras (Eastern)
Regular Season: 44-5-0 (1st LHJQ Alexandre Burrows Division)
Playoffs: Defeated Princeville (4-0), Defeated St-Leonard (4-1), Defeated Longueuil (4-1) to win the league. (Eastern)
Fred Page Cup:  Defeated Truro Bearcats (8-2), Defeated Carleton Place Canadians (8-7), Defeated Collège Français de Longueuil (3-2). Championship Game Defeated Carleton Place Canadians (5-2).

Tournament

Round Robin

Schedule and results 

All games played at Cobourg Community Centre

Semifinal results

Final results

Awards
Roland Mercier Trophy (Tournament MVP): Cale Makar, Brooks
Top Forward: Spencer Roberts, Cobourg
Top Defencemen: Cale Makar, Brooks
Top Goaltender: Stefano Durante, Cobourg
Tubby Schmalz Trophy (Sportsmanship): Nickolas Jones, Penticton
Top Scorer: Spencer Roberts, Cobourg

Roll of League Champions
AJHL: Brooks Bandits
BCHL: Penticton Vees
CCHL: Carleton Place Canadians
MHL: Truro Bearcats
MJHL: Portage Terriers
NOJHL: Powassan Voodoos
OJHL: Georgetown Raiders
QJHL: Terrebonne Cobras
SJHL: Battlefords North Stars
SIJHL: Dryden Ice Dogs

References

External links
2017 Royal Bank Cup Website

Royal Bank Cup 2016
Canadian Junior Hockey League national championships
Royal Bank Cup 2017
Royal Bank Cup 2017.